The 23rd Gran Premio del Mediterraneo (Grand Prix of the Mediterranean), was the ninth round of the 1984 European Championship for F2 Drivers. This was held on the Isle of Sicily, at the Autodromo di Pergusa, Enna, on 29 July.

Report

Entry
As the F2 brigade arrived on the Isle of Sicily, the entry had reduced further to just 17 cars. Come qualifying, only 13 cars were on track. One of these, ”Pierre Chauvet” withdrew from the meeting as the weather was too hot for him.

Qualifying
Mike Thackwell took pole position for Ralt Racing Ltd, in their Ralt-Honda RH6, averaging a speed of 123.691 mph.

Race
The race was held over 45 laps of the hot Enna-Pergusa circuit. Mike Thackwell took the winner spoils for works Ralt team, driving their Ralt-Honda RH6. The Kiwi won in a time of 1hr 08:55.21ins., averaging a speed of 120.632 mph. Second place went to the other works Ralt driver, Roberto Moreno, completing their fourth 1-2 finish of the season. Moreno was just 2½ seconds behind Thackwell. The podium was completed by Alessandro Nannini in the Minardi Team’s M283. Nannini, along with fifth placed driver, Michel Ferté were disqualified for having underweight cars. They were later re-instated on appeal, but no race times were given for these drivers.

Thackwell's victory sealed him, the 1984 European Championship for F2 Drivers title.

Classification

Race Result

 Fastest lap: Mike Thackwell, 1:30.09secs. (122.881 mph)   

Alessandro Nannini and Michel Ferté were disqualified – cars underweight – but they were instated on appeal but no times were given.

References

Mediterranean
Mediterranean
Mediterranean Grand Prix